The 1986–87 FIS Cross-Country World Cup was the 6th official World Cup season in cross-country skiing for men and women. The World Cup started in Ramsau, Austria, on 10 December 1986 and finished in Oslo, Norway, on 15 March 1987. Torgny Mogren of Sweden won the overall men's cup and Marjo Matikainen of Finland won the women's.

Calendar

Men

Women

Men's team events

Women's team events

NOTE: Races marked with a star (*) counts officially for both as "FIS World Cup" and "FIS Nordic World Ski Championships" wins statistics.

Overall standings

Men

Women

Achievements
First World Cup career victory

Men
  Marco Albarello, 26, in his 4th season – the WC 6 (15 km C) in Oberstdorf; also first podium
  Maurilio De Zolt, 36, in his 6th season – the WC 7 (50 km F) in Oberstdorf; first podium was 1981–82 WC 7 (50 km) in Lahti
  Alexey Prokurorov, 22, in his 4th season – the WC 8 (30 km F) in Lahti; also first podium
  Pierre Harvey, 29, in his 6th season – the WC 9 (30 km F) in Falun; also first podium

Women
  Evi Kratzer, 26, in her 6th season – the WC 4 (10 km C) in Calgary; first podium was 1984–85 WC 2 (10 km) in Davos
  Marie-Helene Westin, 20, in her 2nd season – the WC 7 (20 km F) in Oberstdorf; also first podium

Victories in this World Cup (all-time number of victories as of 1986–87 season in parentheses)

Men
 , 2 (18) first places
 , 2 (6) first place
 , 1 (3) first place
 , 1 (2) first place
 , 1 (2) first place
 , 1 (1) first place
 , 1 (1) first place
 , 1 (1) first place
 , 1 (1) first place

Women
 , 3 (5) first places
 , 2 (10) first places
 , 1 (9) first place
 , 1 (2) first place
 , 1 (2) first place
 , 1 (2) first place
 , 1 (1) first place
 , 1 (1) first place

References

FIS Cross-Country World Cup seasons
World Cup 1986-87
World Cup 1986-87